Straža pri Krškem is a small village in the hills above the left bank of the Sava River northwest of the town of Krško in eastern Slovenia. The area is part of the traditional region of Lower Carniola. It is now included with the rest of the municipality in the Lower Sava Statistical Region.

Name
The name of the settlement was changed from Straža Svetega Lovrenca (literally, 'Straža of St. Lawrence') to Straža pri Krškem (literally, 'Straža near Krško') in 1955. The name was changed on the basis of the 1948 Law on Names of Settlements and Designations of Squares, Streets, and Buildings as part of efforts by Slovenia's postwar communist government to remove religious elements from toponyms. In the past the German name was Straža bei Sankt Lorenz.

History
During the Second World War, the Slovene population of the village was evicted and Gottschee Germans were settled in their place. The village was joined together with neighboring Dunaj, and the two villages were jointly renamed Lorenzberg.

References

External links
Straža pri Krškem on Geopedia

Populated places in the Municipality of Krško